The 1902 Arkansas Cardinals football team represented the University of Arkansas during the 1902 college football season. In their second season under head coach Charles Thomas, the Razorbacks compiled a 6–3 record and outscored their opponents by a combined total of 148 to 73.

Schedule

References

Arkansas
Arkansas Razorbacks football seasons
Arkansas Cardinals football